Justin Adam Harding (born 9 February 1986) is a South African professional golfer.

Amateur career
Harding attended Paul Roos Gymnasium in Stellenbosch, South Africa, and played college golf at Lamar University in Texas and represented his country as an amateur golfer.

Professional career
Having graduated, he earned a place on the Sunshine Tour at the first attempt, finishing third at the 2009 qualifying school while still an amateur. He won a tournament in each of his first three seasons on the tour, 2010, 2011 and 2012. He won again in 2015 and 2016 and then twice in two weeks in 2018.

In July 2018 Harding made a rare appearance outside Africa and won the Bank BRI Indonesia Open on the Asian Tour by a stroke from Scott Vincent. Two weeks later he won the Royal Cup in Thailand by 6 strokes, his fourth win in three months.

Alan Burns has caddied full time for Harding since October 2018.

In March 2019, Harding got his first European Tour victory by winning the Commercial Bank Qatar Masters by two strokes over nine runners-up. He was a joint runner-up in the Kenya Open the following week, a result that lifted him into the world top 50 and gave him an entry into the 2019 Masters Tournament. He finished in a share of 12th place to earn his place at the 2020 Masters Tournament.

In March 2021, Harding shot a final-round 66 to win the Magical Kenya Open by two shots ahead of Kurt Kitayama.

Amateur wins
2005 Sanlam Cape Province Open, Western Province Strokeplay Open, Vodacom North West Open
2006 Pilsner Urquell Southern Cape Open Champion

Professional wins (11)

European Tour wins (2)

European Tour playoff record (0–1)

Asian Tour wins (2)

Sunshine Tour wins (7)

Sunshine Tour playoff record (2–2)

Results in major championships

Results not in chronological order in 2020.

CUT = missed the half-way cut
"T" = tied
NT = No tournament due to COVID-19 pandemic

Results in World Golf Championships

1Cancelled due to COVID-19 pandemic

QF, R16, R32, R64 = Round in which player lost in match play
NT = No tournament
"T" = Tied

References

External links

South African male golfers
Lamar Cardinals golfers
Sunshine Tour golfers
LIV Golf players
People from Somerset West
Sportspeople from Cape Town
White South African people
1986 births
Living people
21st-century South African people